Kawaiisu traditional narratives include myths, legends, tales, and oral histories preserved by the Kawaiisu people of the Tehachapi Mountains, southern Sierra Nevada, and western Mojave Desert of southern California.

Kawaiisu oral literature has been documented by Maurice Zigmond. These narratives show their closest links with the traditions of other Numic-speaking groups of the Great Basin. (See also Traditional narratives (Native California).)

References
 Zigmond, Maurice. 1977. "The Supernatural World of the Kawaiisu". In Flowers of the Wind: Papers on Ritual, Myth and Symbolism in California and the Southwest, edited by Thomas C. Blackburn, pp. 59-95. Ballena Press, Socorro, New Mexico. (Several incidental references to traditional narratives later presented in Zigmond 1980.)
 Zigmond, Maurice. 1982. Kawaiisu Mythology: An Oral Tradition of South-Central California. Ballena Press Anthropological Papers No. 18. Menlo Park, California. (Narratives collected by Theodore D. McCown in 1929, Stephen C. Cappannari in 1947-1949, and Zigmond in 1936-1940 and 1970-1974, with comparisons to Chemehuevi and other myths.)

Traditional narratives (Native California)
History of the Mojave Desert region
History of the Sierra Nevada (United States)